Open Source Medical Supplies is a not for profit organization that collates and shares open source designs to make personal protective equipment and other medical supplies needed in the COVID-19 pandemic.

Organization 
Open Source Medical Supplies founded by Ja’dan Johnson and Gui Cavalcanti in March 2020 as the COVID-19 pandemic was escalating. Initial activities were coordinated through a Facebook group which grew to 52,000 members. A team of 130 people coordinate and filter the information in the group.

Activities 

Open Source Medical Supplies provides a library of 195 DIY instructions on how to fabricate healthcare items including face masks. All designs are vetted by a team of thirty healthcare professionals. Open Source Medical Supplies has shipped over 15 million items of medical supplies.

The group inspired the Open Source Ventilator Ireland Project.

See also 

 Shortages related to the COVID-19 pandemic
 Maker culture

References

External links 

 Official website
Open Source Medical Supplies Community (Facebook Group)

Organizations established for the COVID-19 pandemic
Organizations established in 2020
International volunteer organizations
Medical volunteerism
Open source advocates
Citizen science
Do it yourself
Hacker culture